Adebayor Zakari Adje (born 12 November 1996) is a Nigerien professional footballer who plays for Moroccan club RS Berkane and the Niger national team.

Club career
In 2016, Adebayor had trials with Ligue 1 sides FC Lorient and AS Monaco but was not offered a deal at either club.

On 29 August 2018, Vejle Boldklub in Denmark announced the signing of Adebayor from Inter Allies on a loan deal until 30 June 2019. However, one month later, the club announced that they wanted to terminate the loan deal because Adebayor did not show up as agreed and the club had not been able to get in touch with the player.

However, he returned to Denmark in October 2020, when he signed with Danish 1st Division club HB Køge, which is a professional Danish football club based primarily in the town of Herfølge, and secondly in the town of Køge, both in the Køge Municipality. However, on 4 March 2021, the club confirmed, that Adebayor had been loaned out to Legon Cities, because he wanted to be closer to his family due to personal reasons. On 10 September 2021, Adebayor agreed to a year Loan deal with ENPPI SC of Egypt.

International career
He is the top scorer of Niger with 18 goals in 43 matches.

Career statistics

International
Scores and results list Niger's goal tally first.

References

External links 
 
 Victorien Adebayor at Footballdatabase
 https://int.soccerway.com/matches/2021/06/05/world/friendlies/niger/gambia/3508655/
 https://globalsportsarchive.com/match/soccer/2021-06-09/niger-vs-congo/2381855/
 https://int.soccerway.com/matches/2021/09/02/africa/wc-qualifying-africa/niger/burkina-faso/3500795/head2head/
 https://www.oddsshark.com/soccer/world-cup/djibouti-niger-odds-september-6-2021-1419671

1996 births
Living people
Nigerien footballers
Nigerien expatriate footballers
Niger international footballers
Association football midfielders
AS Douanes (Niger) players
US Raon-l'Étape players
International Allies F.C. players
AS GNN players
Vejle Boldklub players
HB Køge players
ENPPI SC players
US GN players
Nigerien expatriate sportspeople in France
Nigerien expatriate sportspeople in Ghana
Nigerien expatriate sportspeople in Denmark
Nigerien expatriate sportspeople in Egypt
Expatriate footballers in France
Expatriate footballers in Ghana
Expatriate men's footballers in Denmark
Expatriate footballers in Egypt
2016 African Nations Championship players
Niger A' international footballers